Caladenia cremna, commonly known as Don's spider orchid, is a plant in the orchid family Orchidaceae and is endemic to a small area in Victoria. It is a rare ground orchid with a single hairy leaf and a single yellow flower with red striations.

Description
Caladenia cremna is a terrestrial, perennial, deciduous, herb with an underground tuber.

The petals and sepals spread widely apart and have drooping tips. It is mostly yellowish with a dark reddish tip. There are four to six rows of well-spaced, foot-shaped calli along the centre of the labellum, decreasing in size towards the front. Flowering occurs in October.

Taxonomy and naming
This species was first formally described by David L. Jones in 2006 and given the name Arachnorchis cremna. The description was published in Australian Orchid Research, based on a specimen found near Whitfield. In 2007, Gary Backhouse changed the name to Caladenia cremna, publishing the name change in The Victorian Naturalist. Jones derived the specific epithet (cremna) from "the Greek cremnos, steep, in reference to the steep slope where this species occurs".

Distribution and habitat
Don’s spider orchid grows in eucalypt forest, with an understorey of heath and Rytidosperma pallidum on steep slaty hillsides. It is only known from the area where the type specimen was found.

Conservation
Between 18 and 35 plants have been counted in the area of occupation. The species is listed as "Endangered" under the Victorian Government Flora and Fauna Guarantee Act 1988 and as "Critically Endangered" under the Commonwealth Government Environment Protection and Biodiversity Conservation Act 1999 (EPBC) Act. The main threats to the species are activities associated with road use and maintenance and weed invasion.

References

cremna
Plants described in 2006
Endemic orchids of Australia
Orchids of Victoria (Australia)
Taxa named by David L. Jones (botanist)